Najaf Governorate or Najaf Province is a governorate in central and southern Iraq. The capital is the city of Najaf. The other major city is Al Kufah. Both cities are holy to Shia Muslims, who form the majority of the population.

Provincial government
Governor:  Luay al-Yasiri (resigned)
Deputy governor: Abbas Alelyawi

Districts
 Najaf District
 Kufa District
 Al-Manathera District
 Al-Meshkhab District

References

 
Governorates of Iraq
1976 establishments in Iraq
States and territories established in 1975